A foreign national wishing to enter Suriname must obtain a visa unless they are a citizen of one of the eligible visa exempt countries or tourist card eligible countries. Surinamese visas are documents issued with the stated goal of regulating and facilitating migratory flows. All visitors must hold a passport valid for 6 months.

Visa exemption 
From 1 July 2022, Suriname unilaterally abolished the requirement to obtain a visa for Suriname for all nationalities if entering for tourism purposes or family visits. However, an entry fee of USD 25 or 25 euros is required to be paid online prior to arrival. The exemption from paying an entry fee applies to holders of CARICOM Passports and holders of a passport issued by the Vatican City.

Visitor statistics
Most visitors arriving in Suriname were from the following areas of residence or countries of nationality:

See also

Visa requirements for Surinamese citizens

References

Suriname
Foreign relations of Suriname